Gustave Clément Nyoumba (born 24 June 1974), also known as Gustavo Clemente, is a São Tomé and Príncipe-based Cameroonian professional football manager, currently managing São Tomé and Príncipe.

Managerial career
In 2011, Nyoumba was appointed manager of the São Tomé and Príncipe national football team.

In 2017, after leaving in 2015, Nyoumba returned to manage São Tomé and Príncipe.

References

External links

Profile at Soccerpunter.com

1974 births
Living people
Cameroonian football managers
São Tomé and Príncipe national football team managers
Place of birth missing (living people)